In mathematics, the energy of a graph is the sum of the absolute values of the eigenvalues of the adjacency matrix of the graph. This quantity is studied in the context of spectral graph theory.

More precisely, let G be a graph with n vertices. It is assumed that G is simple, that is, it does not contain loops or parallel edges.

References 
.
.
.

.

Algebraic graph theory